Alla Kudryavtseva and Anastasia Rodionova were the defending champions, but chose not to participate.

Xu Yifan and Zheng Saisai won the title, defeating Darija Jurak and Nicole Melichar in the final, 6–2, 3–6, [10–8].

Seeds

Draw

References 
 Draw

Tianjin Open - Doubles
Tianjin Open